Megacollybia is a genus of fungus in the family Marasmiaceae. Previously thought to be monotypic, the genus was split into several species on the basis of genetic data in 2007 . The type species, M. platyphylla, is restricted in distribution to Europe, Scandinavia, and western and central Russia. M. rimosa was described as new to science from Brazil in 2013.

See also

List of Marasmiaceae genera

References

Marasmiaceae
Agaricales genera